Corythalia is a genus of jumping spiders that was first described by Carl Ludwig Koch in 1850.

Species
 it contains sixty-nine species, found in Central America, South America, the Caribbean, Mexico, and the United States:
C. alacris (Peckham & Peckham, 1896) – Guatemala
C. albicincta (F. O. Pickard-Cambridge, 1901) – Central America
C. argentinensis Galiano, 1962 – Argentina
C. argyrochrysos (Mello-Leitão, 1946) – Paraguay
C. barbipes (Mello-Leitão, 1939) – Paraguay
C. bicincta Petrunkevitch, 1925 – Panama
C. binotata (F. O. Pickard-Cambridge, 1901) – Mexico
C. blanda (Peckham & Peckham, 1901) – Trinidad
C. brevispina (F. O. Pickard-Cambridge, 1901) – Guatemala
C. broccai Zhang & Maddison, 2012 – Hispaniola
C. bromelicola Zhang & Maddison, 2012 – Hispaniola
C. bryantae Chickering, 1946 – Panama
C. chalcea Crane, 1948 – Venezuela
C. chickeringi Kraus, 1955 – El Salvador
C. cincta (Badcock, 1932) – Paraguay
C. circumcincta (F. O. Pickard-Cambridge, 1901) – Mexico
C. circumflexa (Mello-Leitão, 1939) – Venezuela
C. clara Chamberlin & Ivie, 1936 – Panama
C. conformans Chamberlin & Ivie, 1936 – Panama
C. conspecta (Peckham & Peckham, 1896) – USA to Costa Rica
C. coronai Zhang & Maddison, 2012 – Hispaniola
C. cristata (F. O. Pickard-Cambridge, 1901) – Mexico
C. decora (Bryant, 1943) – Hispaniola
C. diffusa Chamberlin & Ivie, 1936 – Panama
C. electa (Peckham & Peckham, 1901) – Colombia
C. erebus (Bryant, 1943) – Hispaniola
C. excavata (F. O. Pickard-Cambridge, 1901) – Mexico
C. fimbriata (Peckham & Peckham, 1901) – Brazil
C. flavida (F. O. Pickard-Cambridge, 1901) – Guatemala
C. grata (Peckham & Peckham, 1901) – Brazil
C. hadzji Caporiacco, 1947 – Guyana
C. heliophanina (Taczanowski, 1871) – French Guiana
C. heros (Bryant, 1943) – Hispaniola
C. insularis Ruiz, Brescovit & Freitas, 2007 – Brazil
C. iridescens Petrunkevitch, 1926 – Virgin Is.
C. latipes (C. L. Koch, 1846) (type) – Brazil
C. luctuosa Caporiacco, 1954 – French Guiana
C. metallica (Peckham & Peckham, 1895) – St. Vincent
C. minor (Bryant, 1943) – Hispaniola
C. modesta Chickering, 1946 – Panama
C. murcida (F. O. Pickard-Cambridge, 1901) – Central America
C. neglecta Kraus, 1955 – El Salvador
C. nigriventer (F. O. Pickard-Cambridge, 1901) – Panama
C. nigropicta (F. O. Pickard-Cambridge, 1901) – Central America
C. noda (Chamberlin, 1916) – Peru
C. obsoleta Banks, 1929 – Panama
C. opima (Peckham & Peckham, 1885) – USA to Panama
C. panamana Petrunkevitch, 1925 – Panama
C. parva (Peckham & Peckham, 1901) – Brazil
C. parvula (Peckham & Peckham, 1896) – Mexico to Panama
C. peblique Zhang & Maddison, 2012 – Hispaniola
C. penicillata (F. O. Pickard-Cambridge, 1901) – Mexico, Guatemala
C. placata (Peckham & Peckham, 1901) – Trinidad
C. porphyra Brüning & Cutler, 1995 – Costa Rica
C. pulchra Petrunkevitch, 1925 – Panama
C. quadriguttata (F. O. Pickard-Cambridge, 1901) – Mexico to Panama
C. roeweri Kraus, 1955 – El Salvador
C. rugosa Kraus, 1955 – El Salvador
C. spiralis (F. O. Pickard-Cambridge, 1901) – El Salvador to Colombia
C. spirorbis (F. O. Pickard-Cambridge, 1901) – Panama
C. sulphurea (F. O. Pickard-Cambridge, 1901) – Costa Rica, Panama
C. tristriata Bryant, 1942 – Puerto Rico
C. tropica (Mello-Leitão, 1939) – Venezuela
C. ursina (Mello-Leitão, 1940) – Guyana
C. valida (Peckham & Peckham, 1901) – Brazil
C. vervloeti Soares & Camargo, 1948 – Brazil
C. voluta (F. O. Pickard-Cambridge, 1901) – El Salvador, Panama
C. walecki (Taczanowski, 1871) – Guyana, French Guiana
C. xanthopa Crane, 1948 – Venezuela

References

External links
 Photographs of Tullgrenella species from Brazil (Corythalia?)
 Painting of C. panamana
 Painting of Corythalia sp.
 Picture of C. bicincta
 Pictures of C. diminuta
 Picture of C. sulfurea
 Picture of Corythalia species from Panama
 Picture of another Corythalia species from Panama

Salticidae genera
Salticidae
Spiders of Central America
Spiders of North America
Spiders of South America
Taxa named by Carl Ludwig Koch